The Governor of Tripoli was an official who was responsible for the administration of Tripoli in the first half of the 16th century, when the city was under Spanish and later Hospitaller rule.

List

Spanish governors

Hospitaller governors

See also 
 Pasha of Tripoli

References 

 
Lists of political office-holders in Libya
Lists of Spanish colonial governors and administrators
Tripoli